Peter D'Amato is an American author, businessman, and carnivorous plant authority. He is the owner of California Carnivores, located in Sebastopol, possibly the largest nursery of carnivorous plants in the world, and the author of The Savage Garden (published 1998), a book on the cultivation of insectivorous plants. His book won the American Horticultural Society Book Award and the Quill & Trowel Award from the Garden Writers Association of America, both in 1999.

Education
Peter graduated from high school in New Jersey in 1972 and attended the University of Miami, Florida, 1972–1974.

Career

For almost 40 years, D'Amato has been growing carnivorous plants. In 1989, he opened the California Carnivores plant nursery. D'Amato is also the co-founder of the Bay Area Carnivorous Plant Society along with frequently contributing to the International Carnivorous Plant Society's Carnivorous Plant Newsletter. Over the years, he has written several articles and lectured on the subject.

He has traveled all over the United States speaking and giving lectures to different groups. Some of the places he has lectured at include:
University of North Carolina's Botanical Garden
Atlanta Botanical Garden
California Horticultural Society
University of California at Berkeley
San Diego Zoo
Fredrick Meijer Gardens (Grand Rapids)
San Francisco Zoo

Appearances
D'Amato has also appeared on a number of TV shows including:
Home and Garden Network programs
Martha Stewart Living
Various travel and garden shows

References

External links
California Carnivores

Year of birth missing (living people)
Living people
American horticulture businesspeople
People from Sebastopol, California